Cao Mianying (born 12 August 1967) is a Chinese rower. She won a silver medal in double sculls with her partner Zhang Xiuyun at the 1996 Atlanta Olympic Games. She also competed at the 1988 Summer Olympics and 1992 Summer Olympics.

She is from Haiyan County, Zhejiang province. She graduated from Beijing Sport University in sports training. She is responsible for training the national rowing women's team.

She is a member of the Communist Party. In 2008, she became a delegate in the 11th National People's Congress, where she has repeatedly emphasised the importance of the development of sports.

References

Living people
1967 births
Chinese female rowers
Olympic rowers of China
Rowers at the 1988 Summer Olympics
Rowers at the 1992 Summer Olympics
Rowers at the 1996 Summer Olympics
Olympic silver medalists for China
Olympic medalists in rowing
Asian Games medalists in rowing
Rowers at the 1990 Asian Games
Rowers at the 1994 Asian Games
Delegates to the 11th National People's Congress
Medalists at the 1996 Summer Olympics
Asian Games gold medalists for China
Medalists at the 1990 Asian Games
Medalists at the 1994 Asian Games
World Rowing Championships medalists for China
Rowers from Zhejiang
Politicians from Jiaxing
Chinese Communist Party politicians from Zhejiang
People's Republic of China politicians from Zhejiang